Repovci (Cyrillic: Реповци) is a village in the municipality of Konjic, Bosnia and Herzegovina.

Demographics 
According to the 2013 census, the population of Repovci was 137.

References

Populated places in Konjic